Palaeoloxodon recki is an extinct species of elephant native to Africa during the Pliocene and Pleistocene. It is believed that P. recki ranged throughout Africa during from the Late Pliocene to the Middle Pleistocene. Its descendant taxon or last evolutionary stage, "Elephas" jolensis, is known from remains found across Africa of late Middle Pleistocene to Late Pleistocene age. Both P. recki and "E." jolensis are thought to have been grazers, based on isotopic and morphological evidence. Following the extinction of "E." jolensis it was replaced by the modern African bush elephant (Loxodonta africana). At the end of the Early Pleistocene, a population of P. recki migrated out of Africa, giving rise to the Eurasian radiation of Palaeoloxodon.

Subspecies

M. Beden  identified five subspecies of Palaeoloxodon recki, from oldest to youngest: 
 P. r. brumpti Beden, 1980
 P. r. shungurensis Beden, 1980
 P. r. atavus Arambourg, 1947
 P. r. ileretensis Beden, 1987
 P. r. recki (Dietrich, 1916)

New research indicates that the ranges for all five subspecies overlap, and that they are not separated in time as previously proposed. The research also found a wide range of morphological variation, both between the supposed subspecies and between different specimens previously identified as belonging to the same subspecies. The degree of temporal and geographical overlap, along with the morphological variation in P. recki suggests that the relationships between any subspecies are more complicated than previously indicated.

References

Palaeoloxodon
Pliocene proboscideans
Pleistocene proboscideans
Pleistocene species extinctions
Pliocene mammals of Africa
Pleistocene mammals of Africa
Fossil taxa described in 1894